Bà Năm Sa Đéc (1907–1988) was a Vietnamese actress and singer.

Early life
Bà Năm Sa Đéc (Madame Fifth from Sa Đéc) was born in 1907 in Tân Đông village in An Thanh Hạ canton. This canton falls under Châu Thành district, Sa Đéc province, French Cochinchina (now Tân Khánh Đông commune, Sa Đéc city, Đồng Tháp province, Vietnam. Her name at birth was Nguyễn Kim Chung. Her father was a theatre manager named Nguyễn Duy Tam (art name Cả Tam) who established Thiện Tiền Band in 1915. Hence, Kim Chung was contemporary as one famous actress's name at Mỹ Tho named by her father.

Career 
She entered the theatre in 1928 with the art name Năm Nhỏ ("the little fifth child"). She quickly became known for her role as the characters of Đào Tam Xuân (play Đào Tam Xuân), Lữ Phụng Tiên (Phụng Nghi House), Hồ Nguyệt Cô (Tiết Giao usurps the gem) and soon became rated as one of the theatre's "Five Gems", along with Năm Đồ, Cao Long Ngà, Ba Út and the two actresses Năm Nhỏ. She was later renamed as Năm Sa Đéc while Cochinchinese newspapers called her Bà Năm Sa Đéc (Madame Fifth from Sa Đéc).

Theatre

 Đào Tam Xuân in Đào Tam Xuân
 Lữ Phụng Tiên, Đổng Trác in Phụng Nghi House
 Hồ Nguyệt Cô in Tiết Giao usurps the gem
 A madwoman in Ngũ biến báo phu cừu
 Địch Thanh
 Mrs "Judge" Lợi in Breaking the ties

Film
 The mother in The Purple Horizon (1971)
 The mother in Tears of Stone (1971)
 The Ghost of Hui Family (1973)
 Mrs Hai Lành in Alluvium (1982)
 Cho đến bao giờ (1983)
 Con thú tật nguyền (1984)
 Mùa nước nổi (1985)
 In the Quiet Edge Where Birds Sing (1986)

References

External links 

 The story of Bà Năm Sa Đéc
 Chuyện đời, chuyện nghề cô Năm Sa Đéc

1907 births
1988 deaths
People from Đồng Tháp Province
Vietnamese actresses
Vietnamese women singers